Luca Antonelli (born 11 February 1987) is a former Italian professional footballer who played as a left-back.

Early life
Antonelli was born in Monza. He is the son of Roberto Antonelli, a former footballer who played for A.C. Milan from 1977 until 1982 as a striker.

Club career
After spending a few seasons in the A.C. Milan youth teams, Antonelli made his first team debut in a Coppa Italia game against Brescia on 8 November 2006. On 23 December, he made also his Serie A debut, in a match against Udinese.

In the summer of 2007 Antonelli was loaned out to Serie B club Bari, but he impressed so much that during the January transfer window Parma secured him on loan from A.C. Milan for the rest of the Serie A season. He made his first appearance for the Gialloblu against Livorno on 16 March 2008.

Parma
In June 2008, Parma had acquired half of the contractual rights from Milan, for €750,000. While the following summer, he was fully transferred for another €2.5 million, which Milan made a financial income of €1.75 million as the value of the retained half had increased from €0.75 million to €2.5 million.

Genoa
In January 2011, Antonelli was transferred to Genoa for €7 million. Genoa also signed Alberto Paloschi for €4.35 million and sold Raffaele Palladino (€3 million) and Francesco Modesto (€2.5 million) to Parma. The club soon sold Domenico Criscito as Antonelli  had succeeded Criscito as full back.

Return to A.C. Milan
In February 2015, Antonelli moved back to his debut club A.C. Milan, for a fee of €4.5 million signing a three-and-a-half-year contract.

On his debut for his return to Milan on 7 February 2015, Antonelli scored a goal from a corner kick off a header to tie the match with Juventus at 1–1, which did not prove decisive, as Milan eventually lost the match 3–1.

Empoli
On 11 August 2018, Antonelli transferred to Empoli. On 5 October 2020, his contract with Empoli was terminated by mutual consent.

Miami FC
On 17 February 2021, Antonelli was signed by USL Championship side Miami FC. On 10 November 2022, after two seasons with Miami, Antonelli announced his retirement from professional football.

International career
Antonelli made his senior international debut with the Italy national team on 3 September 2010 against Estonia in Tallinn.

Career statistics

Club

International

Honours
Milan
 UEFA Champions League: 2006–07
 Supercoppa Italiana: 2016

References

External links
 
 AIC Profile 
 FIGC Profile 

Living people
1987 births
Sportspeople from Monza
Italian footballers
Footballers from Lombardy
Association football defenders
Italy international footballers
Italy youth international footballers
A.C. Milan players
S.S.C. Bari players
Parma Calcio 1913 players
Genoa C.F.C. players
Empoli F.C. players
Miami FC players
Serie A players
Serie B players
USL Championship players
Italian expatriate footballers
Italian expatriate sportspeople in the United States
Expatriate soccer players in the United States